Leptothyra candida is a species of sea snail, a marine gastropod mollusk in the family Colloniidae.

Description

Distribution
This marine species occurs off Hawaii and the Seychelles and Aldabra Atoll.

References

External links
 

Colloniidae
Gastropods described in 1861